Olivier Macoux Rivaud de la Raffinière (10 February 1766, in Civray, Vienne – 19 December 1839, in Angoulême) was a French infantry commander during the French Revolutionary and Napoleonic Wars.

Military service
 14 June 1800: Commanded a brigade in Chambarlhac's Division at the Battle of Marengo
 3 December 1805: Commanded an infantry division in the I Corps at the Battle of Austerlitz
 17 October 1806: Commanded the 2nd Division of the I Corps at the Battle of Halle
 6 November 1806: Commanded the 2nd Division of the I Corps at the Battle of Lübeck

Notes

References
 Arnold, James R. Marengo & Hohenlinden. Barnsley, South Yorkshire, UK: Pen & Sword, 2005. 
 Petre, F. Loraine. Napoleon's Conquest of Prussia 1806. London: Lionel Leventhal Ltd., 1993 (1907). 
 Smith, Digby. The Napoleonic Wars Data Book. London: Greenhill, 1998. 

French military personnel of the French Revolutionary Wars
French military personnel of the Napoleonic Wars
Commanders of the Order of Saint Louis
Grand Croix of the Légion d'honneur
1766 births
1839 deaths
Names inscribed under the Arc de Triomphe
Generals of the First French Empire